Ted Fidge (born 7 June 1963) is a former Australian rules footballer who played with Melbourne in the Victorian Football League (VFL).

Fidge, recruited from St Peter's, started his VFL career in 1982, when he played nine games. A forward, Fidge made another nine appearances in 1983, then did not feature at all in the 1984 season, but was a member of the Melbourne reserves premiership team. He kicked 27 goals for Melbourne in 1985, from 15 games, which saw him finish second in their goalkicking. In 1986 he played eight games and missed an entire season again in 1987. He made only one appearance in 1988 but it was memorable, as he was reported for striking Collingwood player Darren Millane, for which he got a six-week suspension. It would be Fidge's last game for Melbourne as he was delisted at the end of the season after undergoing a groin operation.

He captain-coached Sale in the 1989 and 1990 Latrobe Valley Football League seasons. The club finished third both times. 
 
His younger brother John Fidge also played for Melbourne.

References

1963 births
Australian rules footballers from Victoria (Australia)
Melbourne Football Club players
Sale Football Club players
Sale Football Club coaches
Living people